The Kakatiya Medical College (KMC) is one of the premier medical schools of Telangana, located in Warangal, Hanamkonda district under the gamut of Kaloji Narayana Rao University of Health Sciences and the Medical Council of India (MCI).

History 
Kakatiya Medical College was founded in 1959 by the Warangal Regional Medical Education society with the active support of the Chief Minister of Andhra Pradesh, Neelam Sanjiva Reddy, the Director of Medical Services of A.P. and the Warangal District Collector Mohsin Bin Shabbir (whose picture adorns the main entrance of the medical school with quote 'The Earth sometimes bears gems and here is one') to provide medical education for students of the Telangana region of the state.

The college was inaugurated on 23 July 1959 by the P. Karmarkar, Minister of Health, Government of India. It was originally in a building donated by the Pingale family at Waddepally and it moved into the makeshift building constructed at the permanent site in November 1961.

Campus 

 of land was acquired for the medical college in Warangal and the permanent building of the college was constructed at an estimated cost of about Rs. 47 lakhs. Indira Gandhi, the then Prime Minister of India, inaugurated the permanent campus in 1966.

The temporary sheds which were constructed earlier at cost of Rs.10.70 Lakhs in 1961 had been remodeled to the boys' hostel. A permanent building for the girls' hostel was constructed and inaugurated by Sri J. Chokka Rao, Chairman A.P Regional Committee in 1970. A hostel for boys was inaugurated by Sri. H.C. Sarin I.C.S then advisor to Governor A.P. on 20 July 1973.

An impressive auditorium with an open-air stage was constructed at cost of Rs. 4 Lakhs behind the college with cinematographic equipment, accommodates 500 students.

The AP Housing Board constructed staff quarters with a guest house on the college campus. On either side of the college building, there are two buildings with a cloak room, canteen, Andhra Bank, Post Office and Engineering Department. In addition R.M.E.S has constructed O.P. Block, T.B. Block, Lecture Hall, Clinical lab, and Mortuary in the premises of Mahatma Gandhi Memorial Hospital, Warangal.

The A.P Government took over the college from R.M.E.S. in February 1977. In the same year the college affiliation was transferred to Kakatiya University from Osmania University. And since 1 March 1997 the college was affiliated with N.T.R University of Health Sciences, and after Telangana formation now Kaloji Narayana Rao University of Health Sciences, Warangal.

The postgraduate courses were started in 1972 and the college is conducting postgraduate courses in all department. The status the college owes entirely to the great architect with broad future vision of late Prof. T. Lakshminarayana, the principal of the college (1960–1965).

All the postgraduate courses are recognized by M.C.I., Medical Council of India.

Courses 
Currently it is one of the premier medical institutes of Telangana, taking in 200 students on merit each year through the NEET (National Eligibility cum Entrance Test) held throughout India. Every year nearly 170,000-190,000 aspirants sit for this exam for a position in the National wide medical (allopathic, ayurvedic, naturopathic, homeopathic), Dental, Veterinary science, Agricultural science, and Horticulture. There are nearly 3,900 seats in MBBS (Bachelor in Medicine and Bachelor in surgery) in  Telangana of which 2,300 are in 20 private colleges and 1,600 are in 13 government medical colleges. The college so far awarded MBBS degrees to 5,600 candidates.

Undergraduate courses 
MBBS – Bachelor of Medicine, Bachelor of surgery (200 students per year): The qualification for undergraduate courses is 10+2 or equivalent education with Botany, Zoology, Physics and Chemistry as optional subjects. Depending on the rank obtained in  the common entrance test NEET, the University of Health Sciences fills the seats in all the medical, dental, ayurvedic and homeopathy colleges in the state of Telangana.

Postgraduate courses 
In 2008 the college had an intake of 70 postgraduate students a year.

Clinical courses 
 Doctor of MedicineMD — A three-year course in following specialties: Internal Medicine, Paediatrics, Radiology, Anaesthesiology, Dermatology, Pulmonology/Chest Medicine, & Psychiatry, Social & Preventive Medicine ( which is both clinical & non-clinical subject)
 MS – (Master of Surgery) A three-year course in following specialties: General Surgery, Orthopaedics, Obstetrics & Gynaecology, Ophthalmology, & Otorhinolaryngology (ENT).
 Postgraduate diploma (two-year) courses in Anaesthesiology, Obstetrics & Gynecology, Ophthalmology, Otorhinolaryngology, Paediatrics, & Radiology.

Non-clinical courses 
MD —  A three-year course in Physiology, Pharmacology, Biochemistry, Pathology, Microbiology, Forensic Medicine& Anatomy
The qualification for all PG and PG diploma courses is an MBBS degree from any MCI (Medical Council of India) recognized medical college in India or an equivalent foreign degree which is recognized by the MCI.

The seats in PG courses are filled through a common entrance test by the KNR University of Health Sciences.

Activities 
KMC alumni from both India and abroad are very active in improving the standards of education and the infrastructure.

In 2009, golden jubilee celebrations were held marking the 50th anniversary of the institution.

Brief facts 

The College Magazine: Quest
The College Festival: Utkarsha

Hospitals affiliated 
Mahatma Gandhi Memorial Hospital, Warangal, a 1200 bedded multispecialty tertiary care teaching hospital and caters to the needs of more than 1 million population in the districts of Warangal, Karimnagar, Khammam and other North Telangana regions.
Government Maternity Hospital, Hanamkonda. In a report published by the National AIDS Control Organisation (NACO), India, the Government Maternity Hospital (GMH), Hanamkonda, was recognised as the only hospital in south India which had successfully handled 1000 HIV/AIDS delivery cases in the last eight years.
Chandra Kanthaiah Memorial Hospital, Warangal.
Regional Eye Hospital, Warangal.
Regional [TB] and Chest Hospital.

Notable alumni 

V. Mohan Reddy – Pediatric cardiac surgeon
 Ravi Kumar Paluri M.D., M.P.H., F.A.C.P. - Assistant Professor, Hematology Oncology, Department of Internal Medicine, Comprehensive Cancer Center, University of Alabama at Birmingham, United States
 Dr. Venkat Kalapatap, M.D. – Associate Professor of Clinical Surgery, Perelman School of Medicine, University of Pennsylvania, USA
 Dr. Lavanya Bellumkonda – Assistant Professor of Medicine (Cardiology, Yale School of Medicine, USA
 Dr. Sarala Devi – HOD and in charge of gynaecology and obstetrics hospitals, Telangana

University affiliation 

As with all medical colleges of the state, it is under the Kaloji Narayana Rao University of Health Sciences located at Warangal, Telangana. The medical college and university are run with guidance from Medical Council of India.

References

External links 

 

Medical colleges in Telangana
Educational institutions established in 1959
Education in Warangal
Universities and colleges in Telangana
1959 establishments in Andhra Pradesh